Richard Dyott (9 May 1667 – 13 May 1719) of Freeford Manor, near Lichfield was an English landowner and politician  who sat in the House of Commons in three periods between 1690 and 1710.

Dyott was the son of Richard Dyott of Freeford Manor and his second  wife  Anne Greene and succeeded his father in 1677.

In 1690 Dyott was elected Member of Parliament for Lichfield and held the seat until 1695. He was re-elected for Lichfield in 1698 and held the seat until 1708. He was elected again in 1710 and retained the seat until 1715.

Dyott married Frances Inge, daughter of William Inge of Thorpe Constantine on 20 September 1685. They had 2 sons, one of whom predeceased his father, and 4 daughters.

References

1667 births
1719 deaths
18th-century English landowners
People from Lichfield
English MPs 1690–1695
English MPs 1698–1700
English MPs 1701
English MPs 1701–1702
English MPs 1702–1705
English MPs 1705–1707
Members of the Parliament of Great Britain for English constituencies
British MPs 1707–1708
British MPs 1708–1710
British MPs 1710–1713
British MPs 1713–1715